Surat Castle was launched in 1824 at Blackwall. In 1825 she sailed to Brazil to serve as the Brazilian Navy's frigate Dona Paula in the Cisplatine War. She was wrecked in 1827.

Career
Surat Castle was built for Johnson & Meaburn. She may have been sold in 1825 to Bassett & Co., London. The Brazilian government purchased her and after extensive repairs (perhaps including lengthening by 11 feet) she sailed to Rio de Janeiro.

On 25 June 1825, Surat Castle, Dowton, master, entered out at Custom House for Rio Janeiro and Teneriffe. On 14 July she was at Deal, waiting to sail to Rio de Janeiro. She arrived at Rio de Janeiro from London on 3 September.

Surat Castle was renamed Dona Paula and assigned to the First Division, also called División Bloqueo, of the Brazilian navy operating in the waters of the Rio de la Plata. The mission of this squadron was to blockade the primary Argentine port of Buenos Aires. Although the squadron had superior resources compared to the Argentine navy, commanded by William Brown, it was unable to stop the Argentines from routinely escaping.

Captain John Charles Pritz replaced Norton. While in command of Dona Paula, Pritz participated in the naval battles of Los Pozos on 11 June 1826 and of Quilmes on 30 June 1826. The Battle of Los Pozos took place between the Argentine and Brazilian forces in view of Buenos Aires. Argentina had only eleven ships as opposed to Brazil's thirty-one warships.

Capitão-de-mar-e-guerra Cândido Francisco de Brito Vitória replaced Pritz, who went on to be a commodore. Between 7–8 April 1827 Dona Paula was Norton's flagship at the naval Battle of Monte Santiago. It was a decisive Brazilian victory in which the Argentines lost two of their best ships.

Fate
Dona Paula was wrecked on 2 October 1827 at the Ilha do Francês, off Cabo Frio (Arraial do Cabo) while pursuing an Argentine privateer. The subsequent court martial sentenced her captain to two years suspension from the Brazilian Navy with the loss of all pay, and to one year in prison at the Island of Cobras in Rio de Janeiro. All his subordinate officers received sentences of imprisonment that varied in their duration depending on each officer's rank.

Note
In 1825 the press mis-identified Surat Castle as a vessel that the Mexican government had purchased, renamed Libertad, Libertdo, or Libertador, and in 1825 sailed to Cuba to lead a squadron blockading the Spanish at Havana.

Citations and references
Citations

References
 

1824 ships
Age of Sail merchant ships of England
Frigates of the Brazilian Navy
Maritime incidents in October 1827